Sub Lieutenant (SLt) Riti Singh Bhatia is one of the first two women, along with SLt Kumudini Tyagi, to have earned their wings for operating from Indian Navy warships.

Early life 
Riti comes from a family that has a history of serving in the armed forces for four generations. Her grandfather served as a signals officer in the Indian Army. Her father,  Commander S K Singh, retired from the Indian Navy. Her mother is an English teacher, and she has an elder sister, Riya. Both her parents helped her train for the entrance exam.

She was born in 1996 in Uttar Pradesh, where the family hails from. They moved to Hyderabad, Telangana in 2002. She holds a Bachelor of Technology in Computer Science. She got married in April 2022 to SLt. Shubham Bhatia, who also serves in the Indian Navy

Career 
Riti completed the 22nd Short Service Commission Observer Course from Southern Naval Command, Kochi. This included 60 hours of flying training including sorties and simulator flights.

On September 21, 2020, Riti was inducted as an Observer (Airborne Tactician) in the helicopter fleet of the Indian Navy. She was among a group of 17 officers, including four women officers, and three officers of the Indian Coast Guard, who were awarded "Wings" on graduating as "Observers" at a ceremony held at INS Garuda, Kochi. Rear Admiral Antony George, Chief Staff Officer (Training), presiding over the ceremony, highlighted it as a landmark occasion.

Her training includes Air Navigation, Flying Procedure, Air Warfare, Anti-Submarine Warfare. She is now training to operate a host of sensors onboard navy multi-role, or Utility Helicopters, including sonar consoles and Intelligence, Surveillance and Reconnaissance (ISR) payloads. She is likely to fly in the MH-60R Seahawk. Her deployments are expected to be on frontline Indian Navy warships including long duration missions.

See also 

 Kumudini Tyagi
 Shivangi (pilot)
 Avani Chaturvedi
 Mohana Singh Jitarwal
 Bhawana Kanth
 Gunjan Saxena
 Kiran Shekhawat

References 

1996 births
Living people
Indian women aviators
Indian Navy personnel
Indian women in war